The 1950 Northern Illinois State Huskies football team represented Northern Illinois State Teachers College—now known as Northern Illinois University—as a member of the Interstate Intercollegiate Athletic Conference (IIAC) during the 1950 college football season. Led by 22nd-year head coach Chick Evans, the Huskies compiled an overall record of 3–6 with a mark of 2–4 in conference play, placing fifth in the IIAC. The team played their home games at the DeKalb Township High School football field, as their usual home of Glidden Field was being renovated during the season.

Schedule

References

Northern Illinois State
Northern Illinois Huskies football seasons
Northern Illinois State Huskies football